Ana Teresa Álvarez Páez (born 19 November 1969), better known as Ana Álvarez, is a Spanish actress and a model.

Biography
Ana Teresa Álvarez Páez was born in Jerez de la Frontera, province of Cádiz, on 19 November 1969. She moved to Madrid when she was about 13 years old, and then to Japan at age 17 to work as a model.

She landed a bit part in Antonio Giménez-Rico's 1988 film Jarrapellejos, making her film debut. She trained her acting chops at the Madrid's Escuela de Arte Dramático.

In 1989 she featured in the Spanish comedy Aquí huele a muerto.

The same year Alvarez participated in Sólo o en compañía de otros, from Santiago San Miguel.

At the end of 1990, she took part in the Televisión Española production film Don Juan en los infiernos, a free adaptation by Gonzalo Suárez of Molière's Don Juan.

After a number of minor film credits, her performance in Juanma Bajo Ulloa's 1993 film The Dead Mother consolidated her career.

The film is about a young intellectually disabled person who sees her mother assassinated in the house after she discovers a thief.

In the spring of 1994, Ana worked with director Ricardo Franco in the comedy ¡"Oh, Cielos"! with  Jesús Bonilla, el Gran Wyoming and Ángela Molina.

In 1995 she appeared in the Hispanic-German production Vivir al límite with film director Michael Guman, and later that same year Brujas came out, which starred Penélope Cruz and Beatriz Carvajal.
Then 1998 saw the release of Cha, cha, chá with Eduardo Noriega and Jorge Sanz. 
In 2000, she worked in A galope tendido and 2001 in Las amargas lágrimas de Petra von Kant.

Filmography

2000s
"Quart" (2007) TV Series
Joaquín Sabina - ...y seguido 1992-2005 (2006) (V) ...vídeo - 'Por el boulevard de los sueños rotos'
GAL (2006) ...Soledad Muñoz
Límites naturales (2006) ..Miranda
Sinfín (2005) ... Laura
Crusader (2004) (TV) ...Veronica
Bolsa, La (2003) .... Mujer Movil
"London Street" ..Ajo (4 episodes,
La boda  TV Episode ...Ajo
Love Story  TV Episode ..Ajo
Moder' no hay más que 'guan (2003) TV Episode .Ajo
Yo 'zoy' 'ingléz'''  TV Episode .... AjoMirada, La  ...AnaAmargas lágrimas de Petra von Kant, Las (2001) (TV) .KarinA galope tendido .... Doro...  At Full Gallop (International: English title)

1990sDulce olor a muerte, Un (1999) ...Gabriela
... a.k.a. A Sweet Scent of Death (USA) Cosas nuestras (1999) ...PaulaMátame mucho (1998) ..Julia
... a.k.a. Kill Me Over and Over (USA) Cha-cha-chá (1998) ..LuciaKing of the River (1995)
... a.k.a. I Get Off at the Next Stop, What About You? (International: English title) Don Juan en los infiernos (1991) ..Chiquilla India
... a.k.a. Don Juan in Hell (International: English title) Solo o en compañía de otros (1991) .Virginia Medina UztuetaAquí huele a muerto... (¡pues yo no he sido!) (1990) (as Ana Alvarez) ..Nicole DarquierTesoro, El (1990) ...Marga

1980sSoldadito español (1988)Jarrapellejos (1988) ...As PetraElegía'' (1987)

See also
 Ines Sastre
 Sonia Ferrer
 Natalia Estrada
 Almudena Fernandez

References

External links
 Biography and photos

Bio Photos
Photos

See also
Andalusian people

20th-century Spanish actresses
21st-century Spanish actresses
Spanish female models
1969 births
Living people
People from Jerez de la Frontera